Ahn Sang-soo may refer to:

 Ahn Sang-soo (born February 1946), former chairman of the Grand National Party
 Ahn Sang-soo (born May 1946), former mayor of Incheon and 2012 presidential candidate
 Ahn Sang-soo (typographic designer) (born 1952), South-Korean typographic designer